Rocky Peak is a  summit in the Olympic Mountains and is located in Clallam County of Washington state. It is situated eight miles south of Port Angeles, Washington within Olympic National Park. Its nearest higher peak is Mount Angeles,  to the west. Klahhane Ridge connects these two peaks. Travelers on the scenic Hurricane Ridge Road traverse the lower south slope of Rocky Peak en route to the Hurricane Ridge visitor center. The mountain was named Rocky Peak by local people from the time of the earliest settlers in the area. Precipitation runoff from the north side of the peak drains into Rocky Creek, whereas the south slope drains into Morse Creek, thence into the Strait of Juan de Fuca.

Climate

Set in the north-central portion of the Olympic Mountains, Rocky Peak is located in the marine west coast climate zone of western North America. Most weather fronts originate in the Pacific Ocean, and travel northeast toward the Olympic Mountains. As fronts approach, they are forced upward by the peaks of the Olympic Range, causing them to drop their moisture in the form of rain or snowfall (Orographic lift). As a result, the Olympics experience high precipitation, especially during the winter months in the form of snowfall. During winter months, weather is usually cloudy, but, due to high pressure systems over the Pacific Ocean that intensify during summer months, there is often little or no cloud cover during the summer. Because of maritime influence, snow tends to be wet and heavy, resulting in high avalanche danger.

Geology

The Olympic Mountains are composed of obducted clastic wedge material and oceanic crust, primarily Eocene sandstone, turbidite, and basaltic oceanic crust. The mountains were sculpted during the Pleistocene era by erosion and glaciers advancing and retreating multiple times.

See also

 Olympic Mountains
 Geology of the Pacific Northwest

References

External links
 Rocky Peak: weather forecast
 

Mountains of Washington (state)
Olympic Mountains
Mountains of Clallam County, Washington
Landforms of Olympic National Park
North American 1000 m summits